P Nagarajan (ta:பி. நாகராஜன்) (b 1963) is an Indian politician and Member of Parliament elected from Tamil Nadu. He is elected to the Lok Sabha from Coimbatore constituency as an Anna Dravida Munnetra Kazhagam candidate in 2014 election.

He is a lawyer and public prosecutor and hails from Koilpalayam village, Coimbatore.

References 

All India Anna Dravida Munnetra Kazhagam politicians
Living people
India MPs 2014–2019
Lok Sabha members from Tamil Nadu
1963 births
People from Coimbatore district